Muxtariyyət (also, Muxtariyyat and Mukhtariyat) is a village and municipality in the Shamkir Rayon of Azerbaijan.  It has a population of 3,088.  The municipality consists of the villages of Muxtariyyət and Miskinli.

References 

Populated places in Shamkir District